Vavincourt Aerodrome,  was a temporary World War I airfield in France.

Overview

The airfield was built during the summer of 1918 by the French troops with an approximate area of 498,000 square meters, as an airfield and as an Advanced Air Service Depot to Colombey les Belles Main Depot.  It was completed on 30 October 1918 having a capacity for 45 officers and 300 enlisted men with 7 barracks.   It was able to accommodate 63 aircraft in 9 hangars.

86th Aero Squadron (Depot) spent here two weeks, 4–18 September 1918, before moving to Behonne, another sub-depot to Colombey.

Vavincourt Aerodrome was used by the 1st Army Observation Group from 22 September 1918, during both the St. Mihiel and Meuse-Argonne Offensives, with its three squadrons of aircraft.

In support of the flying squadrons, the 3d Air Park had a flight of mechanics for repair of both aircraft and vehicles.   Also, the airfield was the home of Photo Sections #2 and #10 for processing and analyzing aerial photography.  The ground support station consisted of various aircraft hangars, support buildings and quarters for personnel.

After the armistice in November 1918, Vavincourt remained active as 1st Army Observation Group HQ stayed here until it was disbanded on 15 April 1919. It this time, the 24th Aero Squadron alone was still present.

Once empty, the airfield was turned over to the 1st Air Depot for de-construction: all hangars and other structures were dismantled and all useful supplies and equipment were removed and sent back to the Depot for storage.  Upon completion, the land turned over to the French government.

Eventually the land was returned to agricultural use by the local farmers.  Today, what was Vavincourt Aerodrome is a series of cultivated fields located south of Vavincourt.  The airfield was located to the east side of the D 28, south of the village of Vavincourt, as seen on the pictures above, with no indications of its wartime use.

Known units assigned
 Headquarters, 1st Army Observation Group, 22 September-11 November 1918
 24th Aero Squadron (Observation) 22 September 1918 – 15 April 1919
 91st Aero Squadron (Observation) 21 September 1918 – 21 November 1918 
 9th Aero Squadron (Night Observation) 21 September-21 November 1918

See also

 List of Air Service American Expeditionary Force aerodromes in France

References

External links

World War I sites of the United States
World War I airfields in France